Embreeville is an unincorporated community and census-designated place in southern Washington County, Tennessee. It is located along the Nolichucky River and on State Routes 81 and 107.

The population of the CDP was 429 at the 2020 census.

Demographics

History 

Embreeville was once a mining community. Lead was first mined, reportedly used in bullets fired at the British in 1780 in the Battle of Kings Mountain. In 1812, William Chester, the owner of the Chester Inn located in nearby Jonesborough, bought  near the mouth of Bumpus Cove and built a crude beehive iron forge built with native rocks. In July 1820, he sold his iron mine and iron works to brothers Elijah and Elihu Embree, whose family had a history in iron production (Elihu is remembered for establishing two abolitionist newsletters, The Manumission Intelligencer and The Emancipator, in Jonesborough).

After Elihu's death in 1820, Elijah partnered with the Blair brothers, Robert, John and William, to establish the Washington Iron Manufacturing Company (renamed the Embree Iron Company in 1831). After Elijah died in 1849, the Blairs became the owners of the company.  During the 1850s, the Blairs' iron works was one of the largest iron production operations in East Tennessee.  A Confederate businessman, Duff Green, took control of the iron works during the Civil War, but the Blairs regained control at the end of the war.

In 1889, English investors formed the Embreeville Land, Iron and Railway Company. In 1891, a railroad, later acquired by Southern Railway Company, was completed from Johnson City to Embreeville. That same year the company formed the Embreeville Town Company to develop an industrial town of thirty thousand inhabitants. In 1892 the company completed a smelter with pig iron output of 150 tons per day. However, the operations stalled due to the Panic of 1893, and all efforts to develop commercial iron production proved futile. In 1900, American interests took over the British holdings. The Embree Iron Company acquired the property in 1903 but was equally unsuccessful in commercially producing pig iron. The company was able to stave off dissolution in 1913, however, when the presence of commercial zinc deposits was recognized. Embree Iron Company began producing zinc and then lead and quickly paid off its debts. Although ore reserves dwindled after World War I, the company continued to operate during the Great Depression. Manganese production began in 1935, and in 1939 the company was the nation's largest producer of metallurgical grade manganese concentrates, boasting an output of 73,000 tons. Manganese reserves were rapidly exhausted, however, and the company was liquidated in 1946. Since then, no mining operations have been done.

Bumpass Cove waste site
In June 1972, the Bumpass Cove Environmental Controls and Minerals Corporation obtained a permit from the Tennessee Department of Public Health, Division of Solid Waste Management, to operate a sanitary landfill located in an old mining site near the head of the cove. In November 1972, the Bumpass Cove Development Corporation [BCDC] discussed the feasibility and design of a proposed liquid waste incinerator to burn the hazardous and hard-to-treat liquid wastes. Tentative approval from the Division of Air Quality Control and Division of Solid Waste Management was given pending completion of a formal permitting process to operate a liquid waste incinerator. The incinerator, located in the old Fowler mining site, was operated in an improper manner. BCDC never completed application for the incinerator to become a permitted facility. Subsequently, it was closed by the Division of Air Quality Control.

A few residents believed that unauthorized wastes were being deposited at both the main landfill and the Fowler site. In July 1979, a picket line was formed to stop trucks from hauling waste to the main landfill. Increased numbers of citizens became involved, and the Bumpass Cove Citizens Group was incorporated on November 26, 1979. The objectives of the group included removal of hazardous waste from the old mine sites, education, and awareness of community development. Skip Foss was the first president. Partly in response to citizen pressure, Waste Resources decided to close the landfill in December 1979.

Fire Department
The Embreeville Volunteer Fire Department serves portions of southern Washington County and northwestern Unicoi County.

References

Unincorporated communities in Washington County, Tennessee
Unincorporated communities in Tennessee